Mompha meridionella is a moth in the family Momphidae that can be found in the northern Caucasus and Greece.

Adults are on wing at the end of May in the Caucasus and the end of July in Greece.

The larvae probably feed on Epilobium species.

References

External links 
 Lepiforum e. V.

Moths described in 2003
Moths of Europe
Momphidae